Sébastien Grégori (born 6 April 1981 in Marseille) is a French football midfielder who currently plays for AS Cannes.

References

1981 births
Living people
French footballers
Olympique de Marseille players
US Créteil-Lusitanos players
FC Gueugnon players
AC Ajaccio players
Ligue 2 players
Footballers from Marseille
French people of Italian descent
Association football midfielders